Robert Wellington Mayhew,  (October 13, 1880 – July 28, 1971) was a Canadian politician and diplomat.

Born in Cobden, Ontario, the son of Charles Mayhew and Sarah Dunlop Mayhew, he founded the Sidney Roofing and Paper Co. Ltd. in 1912 which became one of Victoria's largest businesses.

He was elected to the House of Commons of Canada for the riding of Victoria in a 1937 by-election. A Liberal, he was re-elected in 1940, 1945, and 1949. From 1945 to 1948, he was the parliamentary assistant to the Minister of Finance. From 1948 to 1952, he was the Minister of Fisheries. From 1952 to 1954, he was the first Canadian Ambassador to Japan.

In 1951, in San Francisco, along with Lester B. Pearson, he signed, on behalf of Canada, the Peace Treaty with Japan.

In 1966, he was awarded the City of Victoria's Freedom of the City, the highest award given by the city, for "eminent public service".

He married Grace Logan in 1908 and had three children. His only daughter, Jean Edwards Mayhew, married to James Alexander Lawrason, died January 5, 2006 in Peterborough, Ontario. His son Alan married Canadian sculptor Elza Mayhew; he died in 1943 while serving with the Royal Canadian Air Force when his plane went down in a hurricane.

References

External links
 
Robert Wellington Mayhew fonds at University of Victoria, Special Collections
Robert Mayhew shot and killed a man

1880 births
1971 deaths
Liberal Party of Canada MPs
Members of the House of Commons of Canada from British Columbia
Members of the King's Privy Council for Canada
People from Renfrew County
Ambassadors of Canada to Japan